Michal Smolen (born Michał Smoleń, September 13 1993) is a Polish-American slalom canoeist who has competed at the international level since 2008 for the United States.

He won a bronze medal in the K1 event at the 2015 ICF Canoe Slalom World Championships in London.

Smolen participated at two Olympic Games. He finished 12th in the K1 event at the 2016 Summer Olympics in Rio de Janeiro. He qualified to represent the United States again at the delayed 2020 Summer Olympics in Tokyo, where he finished 5th in the K1 event.

Smolen's first major victory came at the 2014 Under 23 World Championship in Penrith where he won gold in the K1 event.

His father Rafał represented Poland in canoe slalom and his mother Agnieszka was a Polish national team handball player.

World Cup individual podiums

References

External links
 Michal SMOLEN at CanoeSlalom.net
 

1993 births
American male canoeists
Polish male canoeists
Living people
American people of Polish descent
Canoeists at the 2016 Summer Olympics
Olympic canoeists of the United States
Pan American Games medalists in canoeing
Pan American Games gold medalists for the United States
Sportspeople from Kraków
Canoeists at the 2015 Pan American Games
Medalists at the ICF Canoe Slalom World Championships
Medalists at the 2015 Pan American Games
Canoeists at the 2020 Summer Olympics